Elections to Penwith District Council were held on 4 May 2006.  One third of the council was up for election and the council stayed under no overall control. The overall turnout was 39.5%

After the election, the composition of the council was
Conservative 14
Liberal Democrat 12
Independent 8
Labour 1

Results

By ward

References

2006 Penwith election result
Turnout figures
Ward results

2006 English local elections
2006
2000s in Cornwall